Máximo González was the defending champion but lost in the first round to Facundo Bagnis.

Nicolás Jarry won the title after defeating Marcelo Arévalo 6–1, 7–5 in the final.

Seeds

Draw

Finals

Top half

Bottom half

References
Main Draw
Qualifying Draw

Santiago Challenger - Singles